Highfields Private School was a fee paying coeducational independent day school in Redruth, England, catering for pupils aged 4 to 16 years. It closed in 2012.

References

Defunct schools in Cornwall
Redruth
Educational institutions disestablished in 2012
2012 disestablishments in England